Caledonomorpha is a genus of beetles in the family Cicindelidae, containing the following species:

 Caledonomorpha darlingtoni Cassola, 1986
 Caledonomorpha elegans Deuve, 1980
 Caledonomorpha jordani W. Horn, 1897
 Caledonomorpha loebli Cassola, 1989
 Caledonomorpha milneana Darlington, 1947
 Caledonomorpha papuana Ward, 1981
 Caledonomorpha poggii Cassola, 1986
 Caledonomorpha sedlaceki Cassola, 1986
 Caledonomorpha strazanaci Cassola, 1986
 Caledonomorpha ullrichi Cassola, 1989

References

Cicindelidae